Ampelopsis, commonly known as peppervine or porcelainberry, is a genus of climbing shrubs, in the grape family Vitaceae. The genus was named in 1803. It is disjunctly distributed in eastern Asia and eastern North America extending to Mexico. Ampelopsis is primarily found in mountainous regions in temperate zones with some species in montane forests at mid-altitudes in subtropical to tropical regions. Ampelopsis glandulosa is a popular garden plant and an invasive weed.

Species

Plants of the World Online currently includes:
 Ampelopsis aconitifolia Bunge
 Ampelopsis acutidentata W.T.Wang
 Ampelopsis bodinieri (H.Lév. & Vaniot) Rehder
 Ampelopsis chondisensis (Vassilcz. & V.N.Vassil.) Tulyag.
 Ampelopsis cordata Michx. – False grape, raccoon-grape, heart-leaf peppervine or heart-leaf ampelopsis
 Ampelopsis delavayana Planch. ex Franch.
 Ampelopsis denudata Planch.
 Ampelopsis glandulosa (Wall.) Momiy.
 Ampelopsis humulifolia Bunge
 Ampelopsis japonica (Thunb.) Makino – Japanese peppervine
 Ampelopsis mollifolia W.T.Wang
 Ampelopsis orientalis (Lam.) Planch.
 Ampelopsis tadshikistanica Zaprjagaeva
 Ampelopsis tomentosa Planch. ex Franch.
 Ampelopsis vitifolia (Boiss.) Planch.
 Ampelopsis wangii I.M.Turner

Moved to genus Nekemias
Ampelopsis arborea  – Peppervine is now Nekemias arborea
Ampelopsis cantoniensis 
 Ampelopsis grossedentata

Ecology
Ampelopsis species are used as food plants by the larvae of some Lepidoptera species, including Bucculatrix quinquenotella and Sphecodina abbottii.

Fossil record
Fossil seeds from the early Miocene of Ampelopsis ludwigii and Ampelopsis rotundata, have been found in the Czech part of the Zittau Basin.

The fossil species Ampelopsis malvaeformis was rather common in northern Italy in the early and middle Pliocene but seems to disappear at the middle and late Pliocene boundary.

References

External links

 
Vitaceae genera